O Shopping was a Philippine pay television channel owned by ACJ O Shopping Corporation, a joint-venture between Philippine entertainment and media conglomerate ABS-CBN and South Korean home shopping company CJ ENM O Shopping Division. The channel was launched on October 14, 2013. O Shopping programs were previously aired on ABS-CBN and Kapamilya Channel during midnights, as well as on S+A (ABS-CBN Sports and Action), Jeepney TV, and online via iWantTFC.

History
O Shopping was launched on October 14, 2013, when ABS-CBN Corporation signed a deal with CJ ENM O Shopping Division (formerly CJ O Shopping Corporation) to create a TV home shopping channel in the Philippines. Operated by ACJ O Shopping Corporation, ABS-CBN Corporation invested an initial 200 million pesos for the joint-venture. ABS-CBN provides the media platforms and the production of programs while CJ O Shopping provides the products and the logistics.

Prior to the launch of its standalone channel on July 30, 2018, O Shopping programs were launched as part of BEAM TV's content lineup in 2014 until October 1, 2018, as a short-lived afternoon block on state-run broadcaster PTV 4 (People's Television Network) (at that time as a way to fund its operations), and later via ABS-CBN TVplus' encrypted channels 3:00 AM to 5:00 AM from Monday to Thursday during their respective main programming downtime. As of 2016, O Shopping generated 2.2 million pesos in daily sales or 60 million pesos in monthly sales. About 70% of the product purchases on O Shopping are made via cash on delivery payment, with a 5% cancellation rate.

Dissolution
O Shopping was put off-the-air on ABS-CBN Channel 2 on April 21, 2020, due to the COVID-19 pandemic and the enhanced community quarantine in Luzon. The channel also suspended its operations on digital terrestrial television and Cignal. O Shopping was affected by the shutdown of ABS-CBN on May 5, 2020, due to the cease-and-desist order (CDO) issued by the National Telecommunications Commission (NTC) and Solicitor General Jose Calida caused by the expiration of ABS-CBN's legislative franchise. 

On July 8, 2020, ABS-CBN released a statement that O Shopping would cease operations towards the end of 2020, and CJ-ENM has decided to move out of business completely. The retrenchment of employees was held in August 2020. O Shopping permanently ceased its operations on Sky Cable and iWantTFC on November 1, 2020. It was replaced by Movie Central Presents movie block on Kapamilya Channel and its channel space was replaced by A2Z. Meanwhile, the official online store website operated a "Good-BUY Sale" online promo event which lasted until November 15, 2020. On the following day, the website has ceased its operations. 

On July 7, 2021, the social media accounts of O Shopping was renamed as their new brand K Onstyle Philippines. Their online store launched on July 15, 2021, on Shopee and Lazada, selling their existing products of the brands by the former.

Final hosts
Main hosts
 Victor Anastacio )
 Cara Eriguel 
 Hiyasmin Neri 
 Lesley Lina 
 Sandro Hermoso 
 Justine Peña 
 Jamie Gabuya 
 Maiko Williams 
 Kyle Ortega 
 Adi Amor 
 Andre Co 
 Cholo Dela Cruz 

Guest host
 BJoy Balagtas 

Celebrity guest host
 Pokwang

Programming block
 ABS-CBN 
 BEAM TV 
 Cine Mo! (simulcast; when the channel is off-air)
 Jeepney TV
 Kapamilya Channel 
 Knowledge Channel (simulcast; when the channel is off-air)
 PTV 
 S+A 
 Studio 23 
 Yey! (simulcast; when the channel is off-air)

References

External links
 Official website (archived)

ABS-CBN subsidiaries
ABS-CBN original programming
CJ Group subsidiaries
Shopping networks
Creative Programs
Television networks in the Philippines
Television channels and stations established in 2013
2013 establishments in the Philippines
Assets owned by ABS-CBN Corporation
People's Television Network original programming
Filipino-language television stations
Television channels and stations disestablished in 2020
2020 disestablishments in the Philippines
Defunct television networks in the Philippines